Emamzadeh Abdollah may refer to:
 Emamzadeh Abdollah, Ardabil
 Emamzadeh Abdollah, Golestan
 Emamzadeh Abdollah, Hamadan
 Emamzadeh Abdollah, Isfahan
 Emamzadeh Abdollah, Khuzestan
 Emamzadeh Abdollah, Andika, Khuzestan Province
 Emamzadeh Abdollah, Markazi
 Emamzadeh Abdollah, Mazandaran
 Emamzadeh Abdollah, Komijan, Markazi Province
 Emamzadeh Abdollah, Semnan
 Emamzadeh Abdollah, Aradan, Semnan Province
 Emamzadeh Abdollah, Tehran
 Emamzadeh Abdollah Rural District, in Mazandaran Province